Liam is a 2000 British-German film directed by Stephen Frears and written by novelist/screenwriter Jimmy McGovern. McGovern adapted Joseph Mckeown's novel Back Crack Boy for this emotionally raw meditation on innocence and pain. Frears in turn was influenced by James Joyce's accounts of his stern childhood in late 19th century Catholic Dublin.

Megan Burns won the Marcello Mastroianni Award at the 57th Venice International Film Festival for her performance.

Plot

A family falls into poverty during the Depression.

Set in Liverpool in the Great Depression of the 1930s, the story is told through the eyes of a boy, Liam Sullivan. Liam is taking instruction in preparation for his First Communion. His mother is a staunch Roman Catholic. His father loses his job when his shipyard closes. Meanwhile, his sister, Teresa, has become a maid for the Jewish family who own the shipyard.

Liam stutters badly under stress, and his strict religious education does not help. Teresa's mistress is having an affair, and the girl becomes an accomplice. Liam's father joins a group of fascists, who rail against rich Jews and cheap Irish labour. His brother secretly attends meetings with socialists. All of this is a microcosm of a more general breakdown of society.

Life becomes increasingly insecure and people retreat into their own belief systems. This leads to increasing conflict, leading inexorably to a single violent act .

Cast
 Ian Hart as Dad
 Claire Hackett as Mum
 Anthony Borrows as Liam
 Megan Burns as Theresa
 Brad Sewell as himself

Reception
The film grossed $91,000 in the United Kingdom. It grossed $1 million in the United States and Canada and $1.9 million worldwide.

References

External links
 
 
 Salon.com Review: Charles Taylor. 
 The Guardian Review: Peter Bradshaw. 
 The Chicago Sun-Times Review: Roger Ebert.

2000 films
2000 drama films
Adultery in films
British drama films
French drama films
German drama films
Italian drama films
English-language French films
English-language German films
English-language Italian films
Films scored by John Murphy (composer)
Films about fascists
Films based on multiple works
Films based on British novels
British films based on plays
Films directed by Stephen Frears
Films set in the 1930s
Films set in Liverpool
Great Depression films
Lionsgate films
Films shot in Greater Manchester
American drama films
American films based on plays
French films based on plays
German films based on plays
French films based on novels
2000s American films
2000s British films
2000s French films
2000s German films